The M7 cycleway is a  shared use path for cyclists and pedestrians that is generally aligned with the Westlink M7 in Greater Western Sydney, New South Wales, Australia. The cycleway crosses the M4 motorway at Eastern Creek.

The cycleway was completed at a cost of $60 million.

Route

Cycleway use

See also
Bike paths in Sydney
Cycling in New South Wales
Cycling in Sydney

References

External links
Bicycle NSW website
 

Cycleways in Australia
Cycling in Sydney